Kin'iro no Corda ~The After School Etude~  is a radio show that was broadcast by Radio Osaka and TBS Radio in Japan.

The show's personalities are Kishō Taniyama (as Len Tsukimori) and Katsuyuki Konishi (as Shinobu Osaki). In the show, they called themselves , a name made up of Katsuyuki Konishi's and Kishō Taniyama's last name.

After airing at Radio Osaka and TBS Radio, Lantis Web Radio took it up and re-broadcast it as an Internet radio with additional new episodes.

Broadcasting information
Radio Osaka: July 8, 2005 - October 1, 2005 on Saturdays at 12.00am ~ 12.30 am
TBS Radio : July 8, 2005 - October 1, 2005 on Saturdays at 12.00am ~ 12.30 am
Lantis Web Radio: October 14, 2005 - March 31, 2006 on Fridays. 
Note: On October 25, 2006, to commerarate the broadcast of the anime, a public recorded special was aired.

Segments
July 8, 2005 - October 1, 2005 (Local airwaves)

October 14, 2005 - March 31, 2006 (Internet radio)

Guests
October 28, 2005 - Jun Fukuyama
November 25, 2005 -  Kentarō Itō
December 23, 2005 - Daisuke Kishio 
January 27, 2006 - Masakazu Morita 
February 24, 2006 - Hideo Ishikawa

CDs
After the broadcast, the show was collected into 3 radio CDs and 7 DVDs.

The information is as follows:

 Kin’iro no Corda ~The After School Etude~ Radio CD First Score  - Catalogue number: LACA-5429
Release date: November 2, 2005
Kin’iro no Corda ~The After School Etude~ Radio CD Second Score  - Catalogue number: LACA-5476
Release date: February 8, 2006
Kin’iro no Corda ~The After School Etude~ Radio CD Third Score  - Catalogue number: LACA-5520
Release date: May 24, 2006

See also
Kin'iro no Corda media information
Kin'iro no Corda

La Corda d'Oro